John Edward Kelly (December 15, 1862 – November 1, 1895) was an Irish-American boxer, better known as Jack Dempsey, who was the first holder of the World Middleweight Championship (1884–1891). He was nicknamed "Nonpareil" because of his reputation of being unbeatable.

Biography
Dempsey was born on December 15, 1862 in Curran, County Kildare, Ireland. He won the middleweight title on July 30, 1884, by defeating George Fulljames in Great Kills, Staten Island, New York. He held the title for over six years, defending the title against two fighters during the reign.

In Dempsey's first 65 contests, he lost only three times: to George LaBlanche (a loss he avenged) and to Billy Baker twice (both bouts were fixed to have Baker win). This ended when Bob Fitzsimmons pummeled him around the ring and begged him to concede before he was hurt any more. Dempsey, the reigning champion, would not give up; the fight continued and Fitzsimmons knocked him out in round 13. In his final bout, Dempsey, suffering from tuberculosis, lost to Tommy Ryan.

Though Dempsey beat his first battle with tuberculosis, he died at age 32 at the Portland, Oregon home of his wife's parents on November 1, 1895, due to a recurrence of the disease. He was buried in an initially unmarked grave at Mount Calvary Cemetery. M. James Brady, Dempsey's father-in-law, refused to permit former World Champion John L. Sullivan and John S. Barnes to raise funds to erect a monument over Dempsey's grave. The family believed that a four-foot marble shaft was a sufficient memorial. The matter was thus dropped.

Dempsey was inducted into the Ring Boxing Hall of Fame in 1954, and into the International Boxing Hall of Fame in 1992.

Professional boxing record

All newspaper decisions are regarded as "no decision" bouts as they have "resulted in neither boxer winning or losing, and would therefore not count as part of their official fight record."

References

External links

|-

1862 births
1895 deaths
19th-century Irish people
Irish male boxers
Burials at Mount Calvary Cemetery (Portland, Oregon)
International Boxing Hall of Fame inductees
Irish emigrants to the United States (before 1923)
Sportspeople from County Kildare
Middleweight boxers